The 2001 Khaleej Times Trophy was a One Day International (ODI) cricket tournament held in the United Arab Emirates in late October 2001. It was a tri-nation series between the national representative cricket teams of the Pakistan, Sri Lanka and Zimbabwe. The Pakistanis won the tournament by defeating the Sri Lanka by 5 wickets in the final. All matches were held in Sharjah Cricket Stadium, Sharjah.

Squads

Matches

1st ODI

2nd ODI

3rd ODI

4th ODI

5th ODI

6th ODI

Final

References

External links
 Series stats home at ESPN Cricinfo

Khaleej Times Trophy
Khaleej Times Trophy
Khaleej Times Trophy
International cricket competitions in 2001–02